The Slusser-Ryan Farm is a historic farm at 2028 Mount Tabor Road in rural Montgomery County, Virginia, about  northeast of Blacksburg.  The main farm complex includes a house whose core elements are log structures built beginning in 1855, and later enlarged with frame structures.  It has a variety of well-preserved exterior and interior 19th-century finishes that are stylistically eclectic.  Outbuildings include a 19th-century pumphouse and privy, and there is a small 19th-century coal mine on the property.  The latter was probably used by the farm's owners for local use.

The farm was listed on the National Register of Historic Places in 2017.

See also
National Register of Historic Places listings in Montgomery County, Virginia

References

Farms on the National Register of Historic Places in Virginia
National Register of Historic Places in Montgomery County, Virginia
Colonial Revival architecture in Virginia
Buildings and structures completed in 1910
Montgomery County, Virginia